Sonya Branch is General Counsel at the Bank of England. She was appointed by Mark Carney in May 2015 and is responsible for all aspects of the Bank's legal Directorate.

Career

Awards 

 2007 Professions Woman of the Future
 Global Competition Review Women in Antitrust 2013
 2016 Hot 100
 2019 and 2021 GC Powerlist.
 Inside Out Awards: Executive Sponsor Award for the Bank's Mental Health Network (nominee)

 Bank of England LD – In House Team of the Year at the Legal Business Awards
 Bank of England MHN: "Employee Network of the Year" at the This Can Happen award (nominee)

References 

People associated with the Bank of England
English women
Year of birth missing (living people)
Living people